Paddy Carty (1929–1980) was a three-time all-Ireland champion Irish flute player from Loughrea, County Galway. He was well known for his flowing rhythm and his virtuoso skill on his Radcliff System flute, on which he could play freely in key signatures usually considered to be difficult on the Irish flute. He was a frequent playing partner of Paddy Fahey and a former member of the influential Aughrim Slopes Ceili Band.

Discography
 Reels and Jigs in the Galway Manner (with Mick O'Connor), Master Collector #1
 Traditional Irish Music (with Mick O'Connor), 1971
 Traditional Music of Ireland (with Conor Tully and Frank Hogan), 1985

References

    3  Tom Greene  The Boehm Flute in Irish Traditional Music

External links
 Analysis of "Ril Gan Ainm" played by Paddy Carty
 

1929 births
1980 deaths
Irish flautists
Musicians from County Galway
20th-century flautists